Vigdis Holmeset is a British handball coach. At the 2012 Summer Olympics she coached the Great Britain women's national handball team.

References

Living people
British handball coaches
Year of birth missing (living people)
Place of birth missing (living people)